Matvei Andreyevich Michkov (born 9 December 2004) is a Russian professional ice hockey winger currently playing within HC Sochi organization of the Kontinental Hockey League (KHL), while under contract with SKA Saint Petersburg. Considered a promising young player, he made his KHL debut with SKA in 2021 and played for them and their affiliates until 2022. Along with Connor Bedard, Michkov is considered one of the top prospects of the 2023 NHL Entry Draft.

Playing career
As early as 2014, Michkov began to get noticed for his hockey talent, setting scoring records for his age group. He scored 109 points in 26 games in the Russian U-16 league, and then had 56 points in 56 games as a 16-year-old in the U-20 division, besting the previous record for points, held by Nikita Kucherov.

In 2020 Michkov transferred from the youth program of Lokomotiv Yaroslavl to SKA Saint Petersburg. He played the 2020–21 season with both SKA-1946 and SKA Varyagi of the Youth Hockey League (MHL), recording 56 points in 56 games. He led the league in goals scored with 38, and finished eighth overall in points. He also set a new record for points by a 16-year-old in the MHL

In 2021 Michkov made his professional debut with SKA Saint Petersburg of the Kontinental Hockey League (KHL), with his first game coming on 2 September 2021. He split the season with SKA and their junior affiliates; he had 5 points in 13 games in the KHL, and a further 51 points in 28 games with SKA-1946 and SKA Varyagi in the MHL. During the season, Michkov signed a five-year contract with SKA Saint Petersburg that will keep him playing in Russia until the 2025–26 season. 

Michkov missed two months in the KHL after suffering an injury from Alexei Emelin. He joined SKA's minor-league affiliate SKA-Neva of the Supreme Hockey League (VHL) for the 2022–23 season. He is considered one of the top prospects for the 2023 NHL Entry Draft, though some scouts and pundits speculate he may drop due to the ongoing Russian invasion of Ukraine.

SKA loaned Michkov to HC Sochi on 20 December 2022 for the rest of the 2022–23 season. At the time Michkov had played 3 games with SKA and had not recorded a point. He also played 14 games in the VHL with SKA-Neva, recording 14 points. Though HK Sochi finished with the worst record in the KHL, Michkov finished fourth in team scoring with 20 points in 27 games; his point-per-game average of .67 was the highest for a draft-eligible player in KHL history.

International play

Michkov scored a hat trick playing for the Russian national team against Germany in the 2021 World U18 Championships. Michkov was named the most valuable of the tournament at 16 years old. He won the scoring race with 12 goals, the most goals ever scored by a Russian and the second-highest single-tournament total in history, and 16 points. Michkov was also named Best Forward and made the media all-star team. Russia won the silver medal.

Personal life
Michkov was born in Perm and first played hockey there, receiving his first pair of skates when he was 3-years-old. In order to further develop his hockey career in 2015 he moved with his parents and brother to Yaroslavl to join the youth program of Lokomotiv Yaroslavl.

Career statistics

Regular season and playoffs

International

References

External links
 

2004 births
Living people
Ice hockey players at the 2020 Winter Youth Olympics
Russian ice hockey right wingers
SKA-1946 players
SKA-Neva players
SKA Saint Petersburg players
SKA Varyagi players
HC Sochi players
Sportspeople from Perm, Russia
Youth Olympic gold medalists for Russia